A symbolic linguistic representation is a representation of an utterance that uses symbols to represent linguistic information about the utterance, such as information about phonetics, phonology, morphology, syntax, or semantics. Symbolic linguistic representations are different from non-symbolic representations, such as recordings, because they use symbols to represent linguistic information rather than measurements.

A typical kind of symbolic linguistic representation is phonetic transcription. Symbolic linguistic representations are frequently used in computational linguistics.

Linguistic morphology
Phonetics
Syntax
Computational linguistics